Gennadi Mikhailovich Matveyev (August 22, 1937 in Rostov-on-Don – January 15, 2014) was a Soviet football player.

International career
Matveyev made his debut for USSR on October 11, 1964 in a friendly against Austria.

External links
  Profile
 

1937 births
2014 deaths
Soviet footballers
Soviet Union international footballers
Soviet Top League players
FC Rostov players
FC SKA Rostov-on-Don players
Russian football managers
Russian footballers
FC SKA Rostov-on-Don managers
SC Odesa managers
FC Kuban Krasnodar managers

Association football forwards